Possible Side Effects is a 2006 memoir by American writer Augusten Burroughs.  The book contains stories from the life of Augusten Burroughs, ranging from his childhood to the near-present.

Reception

The book received primarily positive reviews, but there was much mention that his prior work, especially Running with Scissors, was better and Burroughs may be running out of material.

Editions 
 Burroughs, A. Possible Side Effects.  New York:  St. Martin's Press

References

2006 non-fiction books
American autobiographies
LGBT literature in the United States